William Henry Beatty Brydge (October 23, 1898 – November 2, 1949) was a Canadian professional ice hockey defenceman who played 368 games in the National Hockey League between 1926 and 1936 for the Toronto Maple Leafs, Detroit Cougars and the New York Americans. He also played 53 games over two seasons in the minor Canadian Professional Hockey League. He was born in Renfrew, Ontario.

Career statistics

Regular season and playoffs

External links 
 
Obituary at LostHockey.com

1898 births
1949 deaths
Canadian expatriate ice hockey players in the United States
Canadian ice hockey defencemen
Canadian people of English descent
Detroit Cougars players
Detroit Olympics (CPHL) players
Ice hockey people from Ontario
New York Americans players
People from Renfrew County
Toronto Maple Leafs players